Seacliff State Beach is a state beach park on Monterey Bay, in the town of Aptos, Santa Cruz County, California. It is located off Highway 1 on State Park Drive, about 5 miles (8 km) south of Santa Cruz, . The beach is most known for the concrete ship SS Palo Alto lying in the water. North of Seacliff State Beach is New Brighton State Beach.

History
The beach was originally home to the Ohlone people.   Spanish missionaries established the Mission Santa Cruz about eight miles west of here.

In 1821, when Mexico gained independence from Spain the area was divided up into land grants. The area of the beach was a part of the Rancho Aptos grant to Rafael Castro in 1833. Castro worked with Claus Spreckels to establish the Castro-Spreckels wharf. The beach soon became a successful shipping port. The logging industry also thrived here with the local coast redwood trees.

The port facilitated major trade with the Kingdom of Hawaii. In 1838, King Kamehameha III requested that Mexican vaqueros from California travel to Hawaii to teach Hawaiians how to manage herds of wild cattle. Seacliff became a popular place to recruit vaqueros, who were known as paniolos by the Hawaiians.

In the 1850s, Thomas Fallon acquired part of the beach and turned it into a resort. He named this new resort "New Brighton", in honor of his favorite seaside resort in England.

In the 1920s, after Claus Spreckels' death, sections of the beach were developed into the Seacliff Park and the Rio Del Mar Country Club.

In 1930, the first California state grant for preserving land was granted for the beach and, in 1931, it became a state beach.

SS Palo Alto

The beach's most notable feature is the concrete ship SS Palo Alto formerly lying at the end of a pier. The ship was hauled to Seacliff Beach in 1929 and sunk and turned into an amusement center, complete with a dance floor, cafe, pool, and carnival booths. The Cal-Nevada Company constructed a dance floor on the main deck, a cafe in the superstructure of the ship, a 4-foot heated swimming pool and a series of carnival type concessions on the aft-deck. The Cal-Nevada Company went bankrupt after only two seasons and the ship was stripped. This left the pier and the ship used only for fishing. It is now permanently closed to the public.  In the 2016-2017 storm season, a section of the ship overturned, and the pier was damaged. During the 2022–2023 storms, the part of the pier closest to the barge was destroyed, and the ship was broken down more.

Animal and plant life
The beach is home to many types of birds and marine life, including mussels, ocean worms, sea stars, sea anemones, barnacles, rock crabs, harbor seals, anglers, flounder, mackerel, halibut, lingcod, perch, cabezon, jacksmelt, steelhead, anchovy, bocaccio (tomcod), kingfish, dark seabirds, sea lions, dolphins, harbor seals, sea otters and whales. The Palo Alto serves as a main place for marine life.

Recreation
Seacliff includes RV facilities, picnic tables, and fire pits.
It is also a popular place for surfing and fishing.

See also
 List of beaches in California
 List of California state parks
 California State Beaches

External links
 Seacliff State Beach Official website

References

California State Beaches
Beaches of Santa Cruz County, California
Parks in Santa Cruz County, California
Aptos, California
Monterey Bay
1931 establishments in California
Protected areas established in 1931